The Lick is a lick, or stock musical phrase that has been used on numerous jazz and pop records and is part of several classical compositions, to the point that it has been described as "the most famous jazz cliché ever". In recent years, it has become an internet meme and is sometimes used for comedic effect.

Musical structure 
"The Lick" consists of seven notes, using five steps on a diatonic scale. The interval pattern is 1 (unison) – 2 (major second) – 3 (minor third) – 4 (perfect fourth) – 2 (major second) – 7 (lower seventh) – 1 (unison). In jazz, it is played swung, sometimes including a glissando or grace note before the fifth note.

History 
The term "The Lick" was coined by an eponymous Facebook group in the 2010s and popularized by a YouTube video assembled from clips from the group by professor Alex Heitlinger in 2011.

"The Lick" was not first seen in jazz, as examples of classical music include tonal sequences similar to "The Lick", but it has been primarily known as a jazz lick for the attention it has received from being commonly used in jazz improvisations.

In 2019, composer David Bruce used "The Lick" as a basis for a string quartet titled The Lick Quartet.

References 

Jazz techniques
Musical improvisation
Internet memes